Kalasan (Javanese: Candhi Kalasan), also known as Candi Kalibening, is an 8th-century Buddhist temple in Java, Indonesia. Administratively, it is located in the Kalasan District (kapanewon) of Sleman Regency.

History
According to the Kalasan inscription dated 778 AD, written in Sanskrit using Pranagari script, the temple was erected by the will of Guru Sang Raja Sailendravamçatilaka (the Jewel of Sailendra family) who succeeded in persuading Maharaja Tejapurnapana Panangkaran (in another part of the inscription also called Kariyana Panangkaran) to construct Tarabhavanam, a holy building for the goddess (boddhisattvadevi) Tara.

In addition, a Vihara (monastery) was built for Buddhist monks from the Sailendra family's realm. Panangkaran awarded the Kalaça village to Sangha (buddhist monastic community). According to the date of this inscription, Kalasan temple is the oldest of the temples built in the Prambanan Plain.

Despite being renovated and partially rebuilt during the Dutch colonial era, the temple currently is in poor condition. Compared to other temples nearby such as Prambanan, Sewu, and Sambisari the temple is not well maintained.

Architecture

The temple stands on a square 14.20 meters sub-basement. The temple plan is cross-shaped, and designed as a twelve-cornered polygon. Each of four cardinal points has stairs and gates adorned with Kala-Makara and rooms measuring 3,5 square meters. No statue is to be found in the smaller rooms facing north, west, and south; but the lotus pedestals suggest that the rooms once contains statues of Bodhisattvas. 
The temple is richly decorated with buddhist figures such as the Bodhisattva and gana. The Kala Face above the southern door has been photographed and used by a number of foreign academics in their books to give an idea of the artistry in stone by Central Javanese artists of a millennia ago. Niches where the statues would have been placed are found inside and outside the temple. The niches adorned an outer wall intricately carved with Kala, gods and divinities in scenes depicting the svargaloka, the celestial palace of the gods, apsaras, and gandharvas.

The roof of the temple is designed in three sections. The lower one are still according to the polygonal shape of the body and contains small niches with statues of boddhisattvas seated on lotus. Each of this niches is crowned with stupas. The middle part of the roof is in octagonal (eight-sided) shape. Each of this eight sides adorned with niches contains statue of a Dhyani Buddha flanked by two standing boddhisattvas. The top part of the roof is almost circular and also have 8 niches crowned with single large dagoba. The octagonal aspect of the structure has led to speculation of non-buddhist elements in the temple, similar to some interpretations of the early Borobudur structure.

The temple is facing east, with the eastern room also served as access to main central room. In the larger main room there is lotus pedestal and throne carved with makara, lion, and elephant figure, similar to the Buddha Vairocana throne founds in Mendut temple. According to the Kalasan inscription, the temple once houses the large (probably reaching 4 meters tall) statue of the Boddhisattvadevi Tara. By the design of the throne, most probably the statue of the goddess was in seated position and made from bronze. Now the statue is missing, probably the same fate as bronze Buddha statue in Sewu temple, being looted for scrap metal over centuries.

On the outer wall of the temple found the traces of plaster called vajralepa (lit: diamond plaster). The same substance also founds in nearby Sari temple. The white-yellowish plaster was applied to protect the temple wall, but now the plaster has worn off.

The temple is located on archaeologically rich Prambanan plain. Just a few hundred meters north east from Kalasan temple is located Sari temple. Candi Sari most probably was the monastery mentioned in Kalasan inscription. Further east lies the Prambanan complex, Sewu temple, and Plaosan temple.

In popular culture
 In December 2016, the fourth expansion of the popular real-time strategy PC game from Microsoft, Age of Empires II titled Rise of the Rajas featured Candi Kalasan as the Wonder of the Malay civilization featured in-game.

See also
 Borobudur
 Buddhism in Indonesia
 Candi of Indonesia
 Candi Mendut
 Candi Plaosan
 Candi Sari
 Indonesian Esoteric Buddhism
 Kalasan inscription (778)

Notes

References
 Holt, Claire. (1967) Art in Indonesia : continuities and change. Ithaca, N.Y.: Cornell University Press.

External links

 Kalasan Temple
 Official site

Buddhist temples in Indonesia
Shailendra dynasty
Archaeological sites in Indonesia
Sleman Regency
Cultural Properties of Indonesia in Yogyakarta
8th-century Buddhist temples